Felipe Bulnes Serrano (born May 27, 1969) is a Chilean lawyer and member of the party National Renewal. He was first Minister of Justice and then he assumed office as Minister of Education following a cabinet shuffle on July 18 amidst the ongoing 2011 Chilean student protests but renounced about six months later on December 29 explaining that he left because a "cycle has finished" and not because he would be fired.

In 2012, Bulnes was appointed by the government of Sebastián Piñera as ambassador to the United States, handing his credentials to President Barack Obama on May 1, 2012. He was afterwards Chile's representative at the La Haya International Court, after being renewed in that post by the government of President Bachelet. On November 23, 2015 he resigned this position and was replaced by former Minister José Miguel Insulza.

He graduated from Pontifical Catholic University of Chile and Harvard Law School.

Sources
Felipe Bulnes Serrano, Gobierno de Chile.

References

External links 

1969 births
Living people
Chilean Ministers of Education
Ambassadors of Chile to the United States
People from Santiago
Pontifical Catholic University of Chile alumni
Harvard Law School alumni
20th-century Chilean lawyers
21st-century Chilean lawyers